Classic hip hop is a music radio format focusing primarily on hip hop music from the 1980s, 1990s, and the early to mid-2000s.

Although stations with such a format date back as far as 2004, the format was first popularized in October 2014, after Radio One dropped a poorly performing news radio format from its Houston station KROI in favor of classic hip-hop. After attracting a dramatic increase in ratings, Radio One began to emulate the station's format and branding in other markets. At the same time, other major radio broadcasters began to introduce classic hip-hop stations in selected markets.

Format and targeting 
Doug Abernethy, general manager of Radio One's Houston stations, described the classic hip hop format as a parallel to the classic rock and classic country formats: these stations focus primarily on hip hop music from the 1980s, 1990s, and early 2000s, featuring artists such as 2Pac, De La Soul, Mike Jones, LL Cool J, Ludacris, The Notorious B.I.G., Queen Latifah, and Salt-N-Pepa. Some stations may include small amounts of R&B in their playlists as well.

Classic hip-hop stations are aimed primarily at listeners between the ages of 25 and 44; Tommy Boy Records founder Tom Silverman explained that hip hop had "entered the realm of credible nostalgia", going on to say that "I'm sure there are kids now who think 3 Feet High and Rising by De La Soul is a rite of passage, just like Led Zeppelin is". The format also appeals to listeners who may not enjoy contemporary hip-hop: iHeartMedia senior vice president Doc Wynter explained that "hip-hop back then was about telling a story about your struggle and your family's struggle. Now the reigning hip-hop king is a multiracial guy from Toronto who did not struggle."

History

Origins 
The classic hip-hop format dates back to 2004, when KZAB, a Spanish-language FM station serving the Los Angeles area, was re-launched as KDAY. The re-launched station served to capitalize on the heritage of the original KDAY on the AM dial (now KBLA), which in the 1980s was the first radio station in the United States to play hip-hop music on a full-time basis. After the station's sale to Fred Sands in 1991, the station dropped hip-hop and switched to business news. The new KDAY originally focused primarily on classic hip-hop music: over the following years, it backtracked on its gold-based format, before reinstating it in 2009. The station's initial success was hampered primarily by its signal, which did not cover all of Greater Los Angeles (a rebroadcaster, KDEY-FM, was also established to improve the station's reach in the Inland Empire), along with the music itself, as hip-hop music from the 1990s was not yet nostalgic to listeners.

However, the new KDAY still enjoyed a cult following: after it was announced that KDAY would be acquired by the Meruelo Group, owners of Spanish-language television station KWHY-TV, it was speculated that the station would drop hip-hop and revert to a Spanish-language format to complement KWHY-TV. Following the establishment of a "Save KDAY" campaign on Facebook led by Dr. Dre (who was among the artists popularized by the original KDAY), the station's new owners confirmed that they would maintain the hip-hop format, citing the "value" of the KDAY brand, along with plans to broaden the station's audience to include Hispanic listeners.

Mainstream adoption 
On October 13, 2014, after having dropped a low-rated all-news radio format five days prior in favor of all-Beyoncé music as a stunt, the Houston radio station KROI, owned by the urban-oriented radio group Radio One, launched a classic hip-hop format branded as "Boom 92". Radio One stated that the format was the first of its kind among major-market stations in the United States, and would serve to complement its other urban-oriented music stations in the market. Listenership of the new format saw a dramatic improvement over its previous all-news format: the following month, KROI improved its audience share of 0.9, 26th place among Houston stations, to 3.2, 14th place in the market.

In response to its success, Radio One began to flip further stations to the Boom format and brand, including Philadelphia's WPHI-FM and Dallas's KSOC. At the same time, other station groups, including iHeartMedia, Cumulus Media, Univision Radio, and Cox Media Group, began to slowly introduce classic hip-hop formats of their own. In November 2014, WTZA became the first station in the Atlanta market to adopt classic hip-hop; a few days later, both Cumulus Media's W250BC and Radio One's W275BK flipped as well, with the latter using the Boom branding. Some stations, over the 2014 holiday season, shifted towards classic hip-hop as a temporary format.

Edison Research analyst Sean Ross compared the growth of classic hip-hop to the emergence of classic rock, which came during a similar youth-oriented shift in mainstream rock towards glam metal bands and grunge.

KROI's success was short-lived; by December 2016, it had fallen back towards a 1.4 share. In January 2017, KROI would drop its classic hip-hop format in favor of contemporary hit radio.

List of stations airing the format

Satellite radio stations
LL Cool J's Rock the Bells Radio - SiriusXM

Networks
Classic Hip-Hop - operated by Westwood One

List of former stations airing the format

See also 
 List of music radio formats
 Old-school hip-hop
 Golden age hip hop
 Urban Contemporary
 Urban Adult Contemporary
 Rhythmic AC

References 

History of hip hop
Radio formats